Christopher Board OBE is a British cartographer and academic. Among his special interests are the histories of cartography and of military mapping in colonial South Africa.

Career 

Board was appointed a lecturer in geography at the London School of Economics from 1 October 1963, eventually retiring as a Senior Lecturer.

He served as chair of the UK Committee for Cartography, and of the British Cartographic Society. In 1980 he was a founder of the Charles Close Society, for the study of Ordnance Survey maps, and served as its chair for sixteen years to 2012. During his chairmanship, he almost doubled the society's membership.

He was co-organiser of the International Cartographic Association (ICA) conference in 1991. He edited the ICA Newsletter for several years from the mid-1990s. He chaired the ICA's History of Cartography Commission from 1999 to 2003, having earlier played a key role in its Commission of Cartographic Communication for seven years, after the death of its sitting chair.

His 1993 book with Peter Barber, head of maps at the British Library, Tales from the map room : fact and fiction about maps and their makers was a tie-in with the BBC television series Tales from the Map Room.

He has written text introductions for several reprints of old Ordnance Survey maps, published by Alan Godfrey Maps.

Honours 

Board was appointed an Honorary Fellow of the International Cartographic Association in 1999, and received the British Cartographic Society Medal in September 2004.

He was appointed an Officer of the Order of the British Empire (OBE) in the 2005 New Year Honours, for services to cartography.

Personal life 

In 1983, Board  was a contestant, partnered with a student, John Edmunds, on an episode of the television game show Treasure Hunt centred on the Forest of Dean, Gloucestershire.

Selected papers 

 
 "Maps as Models". In: Chorley R.J., and Haggett P. (eds.), Models in Geography. London: Methuen. 1967.

References 

Living people
Officers of the Order of the British Empire
British cartographers
Academics of the London School of Economics
Year of birth missing (living people)
Place of birth missing (living people)
20th-century British historians
21st-century British historians